Itzhak Katzenelson (also transcribed as Icchak-Lejb Kacenelson, Jizchak Katzenelson; Yitzhok Katznelson) (1 July 1886 – 1 May 1944) was a Polish Jewish teacher, poet and dramatist. He was born in 1886 in Karelichy near Minsk, and was murdered on 1 May 1944 in Auschwitz.

Biography
Soon after his birth Katzenelson's family moved to Łódź, Poland, where he grew up. He worked as a teacher, founding a school, and as a dramatist in both Yiddish and Hebrew, starting a theatre group which toured Poland and Lithuania. Following the German invasion of Poland in 1939 he and his family fled to Warsaw, where they got trapped in the Ghetto. There he ran an underground school for Jewish children. His wife and two of his sons were deported to the Treblinka extermination camp and murdered there.

Katzenelson participated in the Warsaw Ghetto Uprising, starting on 19 April 1943. To save his life, friends supplied him and his surviving son with forged Honduran passports. They managed to leave the ghetto but later ended up in Germans hands as part of the Hotel Polski affair. He was deported to a detention camp in Vittel, France, where the Nazis held American and British citizens and nationals of other Allied and neutral countries, for possible later prisoner exchange.

In Vittel, Katzenelson wrote Dos lid funem oysgehargetn yidishn folk ("Song of the Murdered Jewish People"). He put the manuscript in bottles and buried them under a tree, from where it was recovered after the war. A copy was sewn into the handle of a suitcase and later taken to Israel.

In late April 1944, Itzhak Katzenelson and his son Zvi were sent on a transport to the Auschwitz concentration camp, where they were murdered on 1 May 1944.

Legacy
The Ghetto Fighters' House Holocaust and Jewish Resistance Heritage Museum in Israel, is named in his memory. "The Song of the Murdered Jewish People" has been translated into numerous languages and published as an individual volume.

Published works
 Vittel Diary (22.v.43 – 16.9.43), Israel: Ghetto Fighters' House, 1964. Translated from the Hebrew by Dr. Myer Cohen; includes biographical notes and appendix of terms and place names.
 Le Chant du peuple juif assassiné, France: Bibliothèque Medem, 2005.

References

External links
 Nine poems by Yitzkhok Katznelson in Yiddish and English at Poetry in Hell
 Itzhak Katzenelson genealogy  Geni Family Tree
 excerpt from The Song of the Murdered Jewish People
 I had a dream poem
  Dos lid funem oysgehargetn Yidishn folk Pdf
  Yitshak Katsenelson zayn lebn un shafn Biography by his sister Pdf
  Katzenelson.de. Website of translator Helmut Homfeld
  Schmidt, Andreas (1997). "Verstumme nicht!: Die Anstiftung zum Dialog in Jizchak Katzenelsons 'Großem Gesang vom ausgerotteten jüdischen Volk. www.buber.de
  Yitskhok Katzenelson at Maison de la culture yiddish-Bibliothèque Medem
 Free version in Yiddish (with Hebrew letters) of Dos lid funem oysgehargetn yidishn folk

1886 births
1944 deaths
Warsaw Ghetto inmates
Polish people who died in Auschwitz concentration camp
Modern Hebrew writers
People from Karelichy
Polish poets
Polish civilians killed in World War II
Yiddish-language poets
Jewish poets
Jewish Combat Organization members
Polish Jews who died in the Holocaust
Ładoś List